Eruini Heina Taipari (1889–1956) was a New Zealand tribal leader. Of Māori descent, he identified with the following tribes: Ngāti Maru], Ngati Paoa, Ngati Tamatera and Ngati Whanaunga iwi. He was born in Thames, Thames/Coromandel, New Zealand in about 1889.

References

1889 births
1956 deaths
Ngāti Tamaterā people
Ngāti Whanaunga people
Ngāti Maru (Hauraki)
People from Thames, New Zealand